is a romantic comedy manga series written and illustrated by Waka Kakitsubata. It began serialization in Media Factory's Monthly Comic Gene magazine from June 2013 to June 2018. An anime television series adaptation by Yumeta Company aired from April 6 to September 21, 2018.

Plot
Atsuhiro "Akkun" Kagari is known to be harsh towards his girlfriend Non "Nontan" Katagiri, but is secretly infatuated with her, regularly following her and watching over her like a stalker. The series follows their interactions with each other as well as their classmates.

Characters

 Title character of the series. He has dark blonde hair. He's a Tsundere who really loves Nontan. In front of Nontan, he always shows his "Tsun" side and hides his "Dere" side. His feelings towards her are secretly quite intense, to the point of occasionally resembling a stalker.

 Akkun's girlfriend. She has shoulder-length black hair. She's a Deredere who really loves Akkun. In front of Akkun, she's always shows her "Dere" side. Akkun's Tsundere personality doesn't bother her.

Akkun's best friend. He has dark blue hair. He knows about Akkun's and Chiho's Tsundere personalities. He's a serious game otaku who frequently comes to Akkun's house to play gal games on his TV, much to Chiho's frustration.

Akkun's younger sister, presently in the eighth grade. Like her brother, she has dark blonde hair, which is tied into a ponytail that reaches her arms. Also like her brother, she's a Tsundere who really loves Nontan, but unlike Akkun, her love is more friendly than romantic. Unlike her brother, in front of Nontan, she always shows her "Dere" side and hides her "Tsun" side. On the other hand, she appears to demonstrate a growing romantic attraction toward Matsuo. At first, she consistently shows only her “Tsun” while fighting to hide her “Dere”, but this becomes progressively harder to do.

Akkun's teacher. He has brown hair. He is a serious and world-weary man. He is often the target of Konagi's antics.

Akkun's classmate. She has pink hair. She is an annoying and air-headed girl who is an optimist to a fault. She has a passionate crush on Kubomura.

Media

Manga
Waka Kakitsubata launched the manga in Media Factory's josei manga magazine Monthly Comic Gene in June 2013. The manga is also serialized on Media Factory's Pixiv based web magazine Gene Pixiv. Eight tankōbon volumes have been released to date.

Volumes

Drama CD
An audio drama CD was released by Media Factory in December 2016.

Anime
An anime adaptation was announced via a wraparound band on the seventh volume of the manga on November 27, 2017. The television series is directed by Shin Katagai and written by Yuka Yamada, with animation by Yumeta Company. Character designs are provided by Motohiro Taniguchi. The series aired from April 6 to September 21, 2018, on AT-X as a short-form series with 4-minute episodes. The second opening theme is "We☆Pace!" by Haruna Ōshima feat. Ebisu coffret. Crunchyroll streamed the series.

Reception
The manga had sold over 480 thousand copies and had over 11 million views on Pixiv, as of November 2017.

Notes

References

External links

  
 

Anime series based on manga
Media Factory manga
Kadokawa Dwango franchises
Romantic comedy anime and manga
Shōjo manga
Yumeta Company